Matías Ernesto Ocampo Ornizún (born 14 March 2002) is a Uruguayan professional footballer who plays as a midfielder for Swiss Challenge League club Bellinzona.

Club career
A youth academy graduate of Defensor Sporting, Ocampo made his professional debut on 30 August 2020 in a 2–1 league win against Liverpool Montevideo.

In January 2023, Ocampo joined Swiss club Bellinzona.

International career
Ocampo is a former Uruguayan youth international. He has represented his nation at the 2017 South American U-15 Championship and the 2019 South American U-17 Championship.

Career statistics

References

External links
 

2002 births
Living people
Footballers from Montevideo
Association football midfielders
Uruguayan footballers
Uruguay youth international footballers
Uruguayan Primera División players
Uruguayan Segunda División players
Defensor Sporting players
Club Atlético River Plate (Montevideo) players
AC Bellinzona players
Uruguayan expatriate footballers
Uruguayan expatriate sportspeople in Switzerland
Expatriate footballers in Switzerland